Chelativorans oligotrophicus is a Gram-negative, aerobic and rod-shaped from the genus of Chelativorans which has been isolated from soil from Xinjiang.

References

Phyllobacteriaceae
Bacteria described in 2020